JSC Latvian Railway ( or LDz) was established on 2 September 1991 and is seen as the successor of the Latvian Railway Board (Latvian Railways) which was established on 5 August 1919.

Latvijas dzelzceļš is a state-owned company and 100% of its shares are owned by the state. The company’s shareholder is the Ministry of Transport.

Latvijas dzelzceļš is the manager of the public railway infrastructure in Latvia and the controlling company of the Latvijas dzelzceļš Group. The company provides public railway infrastructure, service facility operator (freight wagon assembly handling, wagon maintenance and inspection, maintenance and development of passenger stations and stops), electricity distribution and trade, real estate rental, information technology, electronic communications, as well as other principal services.

The Latvijas dzelzceļš Group includes the parent company – state joint-stock company Latvijas dzelzceļš, and six subsidiaries: 
 SIA LDZ CARGO - operates rail cargo and international passenger transport;
 SIA LDZ Loģistika - logistics and multimodal transport services company;
 SIA LDZ Infrastruktūra - infrastructure construction and maintenance company;
 SIA LDZ Ritošā Sastāva Serviss - rolling stock repair and maintenance company;
 SIA LDZ Apsardze – security service company;
Joint-stock LatRailNet - determines the infrastructure tariff and the allocation of railway infrastructure capacity.
LDz also operates the Latvian Rail History Museum, with exhibitions both in Riga and Jelgava.

Railway history of Latvia 

On September 12, 1861, the first independent railway line in the territory of Latvia, which connected Riga with Daugavpils, was handed over for general use. On 15 December 1862, the construction of the railway between St. Petersburg and Warsaw was completed, creating the first railway junction in Daugavpils in the territory of Latvia. By 1880,  of rail-lines were built in Latvia.

In the period up to 1900, in parallel with the construction of new state-funded railways, the previously built private railways were bought out and concentrated within state-run structures. The other railways are supervised by the Russian Northwestern Railway and Liepaja - Romna Railway administrations. In 1904, the  Moscow-Ventspils railway line was put into operation, a significant part of which - between Zilupe and Ventspils (a length of ), is located in the territory of Latvia. Consequently, all major Latvian ports are connected by railway lines.

At the beginning of the 20th century, large-scale reconstruction works of the Riga railway junction began. New railway stations and connecting lines are built, and a new bridge over the Daugava is constructed. Due to the beginning of the First World War, the reconstruction of the Riga passenger station is not completed.

After the Proclamation of the Republic of Latvia On 5 August 1919, with the establishment of the Latvian Railway Board, the Latvian state takes over the management of almost all railways located in the territory of Latvia. Narrow gauge railway lines remain in private hands, only one of which continues to be operated by a private legal entity. Since 5 August 1919, the board then operates the state-owned Latvijas dzelzceļi ('Latvijas valsts dzelzceļi', Latvian State Railways) company. It only takes a few years to completely rebuild the railway infrastructure in Latvia. Already in 1925, the construction of new railways are started, stations and trains are modernized, and the Riga passenger station is provided with an electrical interlocking device for switches and signals - the first train safety device of this type in the Baltic States. By 1940,  of new railway lines are built, more than 200 iron bridges are constructed, as well as 130 new station buildings, while infrastructure destroyed during the war was completely restored. The Soviet occupation authorities dissolve the Latvian state railway company on 1 September 1940.

During the Second World War, the Latvian railway network was again severely damaged: most railway bridges and many station buildings were destroyed, and irreversible damage was caused to the tracks, as well as to the communications and signaling facilities.

In the period until 1950, the railway industry was completely revived in key areas and a period of development began, which included electrification of railways on suburban passenger routes, construction of new bridges, transition to diesel cargo trains and long-distance passenger transport, improvement of rolling stock safety, etc. Along with the development of Ventspils port and the USSR industrialization policy in general from the 1960s to 80s, the volume of cargo transportation grows rapidly in the coming years. Electric and diesel trains manufactured in Riga run on all suburban and local traffic routes, serving more and more passengers. Since 1963, the railways of Latvia, Estonia, Lithuania and the Kaliningrad region were supervised by the Baltic Railway Administration (Pribaltiyskaya railway), whose top management was located in Riga.

History of Latvijas dzelzceļš Group 

On 1 January 1992, the supervision and operation of all public railways in the territory of Latvia was transferred to the state enterprise Latvijas dzelzceļš . At this moment, the restored Latvian state-owned company has at its disposal  of railway lines and 23,000 employees.

In 1993, the state enterprise Latvijas dzelzceļš becomes state-owned joint-stock company Latvijas dzelzceļš , whose shares are fully owned by the Latvian state.

In accordance with the restructuring program of the state-owned joint-stock company Latvijas dzelzceļš , the first subsidiary of the Latvijas dzelzceļš Group - Pasažieru Vilciens, was established in 2001 on the basis of the company's structural units Elektrovilciens and Dīzeļvilciens, which has been an independent state-owned joint-stock company since 2008.

In 2003, a subsidiary SIA Dzelzceļa Apsardze was established, which in 2007 was renamed SIA LDZ Apsardze.

In connection with Latvia’s accession to the European Union, based on the restructuring program of the state-owned joint-stock company Latvijas dzelzceļš, the Group's subsidiaries were established in 2005: SIA LDZ Cargo, SIA LDZ Infrastruktūra and SIA LDZ Ritošā Sastāva Serviss.

By separating logistics services from cargo services, in 2008 the subsidiary SIA LDZ Loģistika was established.

In accordance with the amendments to the Law on Railways of the Republic of Latvia, in order to ensure the essential functions of the infrastructure manager within the Latvijas dzelzceļš Group, joint-stock LatRailNet was established in 2010.

The directors of Latvijas Dzelzceļš 

 Staņislavs Baiko (from 1991 to 1994)
 Vitolds Kūliņš (1994)
 Andris Zorgevics (from 1994 to 2005)
 Uģis Magonis (from 2005 to 2014)
 Aivars Strakšas (from 2014 to 2015)
 Edvīns Bērziņš (from 2015 to 2019)
 Māris Kleinbergs (from 2019)

The main task of Latvijas dzelzceļš in the field of the Group's management is to ensure the development and competitiveness of the Group's business directions, achieving better results than would be possible if each business direction operated separately, while ensuring the operation of subsidiaries in the interests of the national economy.

Corporate policy 
The mission of the Latvijas dzelzceļš Group is to safely, efficiently and sustainably manage and develop Latvia’s railway infrastructure, while providing competitive railway and logistics services that serve in the interests of the Latvian national economy and society.

The vision of the Latvijas dzelzceļš Group is to become an efficient, competitive company providing high added value to customers by responding flexibly to changes in the transport sector.

Latvijas dzelzceļš is one of the largest employers in Latvia - employees who have been working for the company for several generations are its foundation. A professional team of railwaymen allows the Group to achieve its goals, adapt to market changes and work in conditions of high competition, while ensuring a consistently high level of traffic safety.

Since 2016 Latvijas dzelzceļš has been preparing a sustainability report, which was initially prepared based on the international GRI (Global Reporting Initiative) guidelines, but since 2018 the report has been prepared taking into account the basic requirements of the GRI standard. An independent audit company provides its conclusion on the annual report. All sustainability reports are available at: parskati.ldz.lv.

Domestic routes

Passenger services are operated by Pasažieru vilciens. The passenger lines with current service are:
 Torņakalns – Tukums II Railway1
 Riga – Jelgava Railway2 
 Jelgava – Liepāja Railway services are twice a week
 Riga – Daugavpils Railway3 3 to 4 times a day
 Krustpils – Rēzekne – Zilupe (border of Russia)
 Two  trains a day from Riga continue past Krustpils on this diesel train line in Latvia's central and eastern countryside, as well as the daily service from Riga to Moscow.
 Rīga – Sigulda – Cēsis – Valmiera – Valga (border of Estonia)
 Leaving the Riga Central Station, this branch includes neighborhood stations Zemitāni, Čiekurkalns, and Jugla. During Soviet times, electric trains went up to Sigulda but the service is now diesel.  Sigulda has around 11 trains a day, Cēsis 6, Valmiera 4, and 3 trains a day continue the full length of the line to serve the Latvian / Estonian border towns of Valka and Valga through a joint station in Valga.
 Zemitāni – Skulte Railway4
 Pļaviņas – Gulbene
 This branch line from Pļaviņas (between Aizkraukle and Krustpils on the Riga – Daugavpils line) is served by two diesel trains a week from Riga.  The trains arrive from Riga late on Friday and Sunday nights, leaving to return to Riga at 4am on Saturday and Monday mornings. An additional Saturday daytime service was suspended in 2012.

Lines where passenger services have been suspended in recent years include:
 Rīga – Reņģe (Border of Lithuania)
 Rīga – Ērgļi
 Jelgava – Meitene (Border of Lithuania)
 Jelgava – Krustpils
 Kārsava (Border of Russia) – Rēzekne – Daugavpils – Zemgale (Border of Lithuania)
 Eglaine (Border of Lithuania) – Daugavpils – Indra (Border of Belarus)

1  Electrified to Tukums
2  Electrified to Jelgava
3  Electrified to Aizkraukle
4  Whole line is electrified

International routes
There are rail links with Russia, Lithuania, Belarus, and Estonia. LDz trains stop in Valka/Valga and connections to Tartu are available via Estonian operator Elron. Daugavpils is connected to Vilnius by a Lithuanian Railways service at weekends.
All international passenger services were suspended in March 2020 during the coronavirus pandemic. Services to Russia, Ukraine and Belarus were not restarted following the pandemic due to the Russian invasion of Ukarine in 2022 and state sanctions against the Belarusian and Russian governments.
Overnight services to/from Riga and Russian cities were operated by Latvijas Ekspresis (Latvia Express).

 Riga – Zilupe – Moscow
 Daily overnight service (Suspended March 2020)
 Riga – Zilupe – Saint Petersburg
 Daily overnight service (Suspended March 2020)
 Riga – Daugavpils – Minsk
 Every fourth day overnight service (Suspended)
 Riga – Šiauliai – Vilnius – Minsk – Kyiv (Suspended)
 Every fourth day overnight service operated with Ukrainian stock
 Together the two  Riga – Minsk trains offer connection every other day
 Daugavpils – Vilnius (suspended)
 Two to three times a day every Saturday and Sunday

Freight services

Latvian railways carry a large quantity of freight cargo, and freight trains operate over the whole current passenger network, and a number of lines currently closed to passenger services.

Other services

There is a narrow gauge railway between Gulbene and Alūksne, operated by the company SIA "Gulbenes - Alūksnes bānītis" under government contract, using Russian and Polish built heritage rolling stock. Three narrow gauge trains a day operate on the  route between the two towns. As of 2019, the service has been extended to two daily trains in both directions.

Rolling stock

Diesel locos
Freight
 M62 – 33 locos
 2M62 – 40 locos
 2M62U – 30 locos
 2TE10M – 10 locos
 2TE10U – 14 locos
Passenger
 TEP70 – 15 locos
Shunt
 ČME3M, ČME3MB (ChME3) – 57 locos
 TEM2 – 7 locos
 TGK2V – 1 loco
 TGM3 – 1 loco
 TGM23, TGM23B – 2 locos

EMUs
 ER2 – 32 trains
 ER2T – 6 trains (7113-7118)
 ER2M – 1 train (No 605)
Škoda Vagonka EMUs – 32 trains ordered

DMUs
 DR1A – 31 trains
 DR1AM – 10 trains
 AR2 (railbus) – 1 train (used by workers on Jelgava-Krustpils line)

See also 

 History of rail transport in Latvia
 Rail transport in Latvia
 Transport in Latvia

References

External links
Company homepage

Railway companies of Latvia
Companies based in Riga
Latvian brands
Companies of Latvia